The Big Read (trans. Golyamoto chetene) was a survey initiated by the Bulgarian National Television, the goal of which was to find the favorite book of Bulgarians. Based on the BBC campaign of 2003, Golyamoto chetene started in October 2008 and finished on 25 March 2009 with the announcement of the winner. Initially Bulgarian public voted for any book they wished. Based on those votes a list of the top 100 books was drawn up. The 12 books that headed the list were put forward for further voting, which had to determine the winner.

Top twelve

Winners by nationality

References and notes

External links
Official website of the "Big Read - Bulgaria"

Bulgarian literature
Book promotion
Literacy
Community building
Lists of novels